Cathedral Rock is a  pillar located within Glen Canyon National Recreation Area, in Coconino County of northern Arizona. It can be seen from nearby U.S. Route 89A (US 89A) at Marble Canyon. This geographical feature's name was bestowed prior to 1900, and officially adopted in 1969 by the U.S. Board on Geographic Names.

Geology
Cathedral Rock is located on the Colorado Plateau. This erosional remnant is composed of red sandstone of the Moenkopi Formation, which was laid down during the Triassic. It is overlain by a Shinarump Conglomerate caprock. Precipitation runoff from this feature drains to the nearby Colorado River, one-half mile to the east.

Climate
According to the Köppen climate classification system, Cathedral Rock is located in an arid climate zone with hot, very dry summers, and chilly winters with very little snow. Climate data for Page, Arizona, 12 miles to the northeast.

See also
 Colorado Plateau
 List of rock formations in the United States

Gallery

References

External links
 Weather forecast: National Weather Service

Colorado Plateau
Landforms of Coconino County, Arizona
Sandstone formations of the United States
Glen Canyon National Recreation Area
Buttes of Arizona